Events in the year 1941 in Belgium

Incumbents
Monarch: Leopold III (prisoner)
Prime Minister: Hubert Pierlot (in exile)
Head of the occupying Military Administration in Belgium and Northern France: Alexander von Falkenhausen
Head of the administrative staff of the Occupation: Eggert Reeder

Events
 1 January – Léon Degrelle calls on Belgians to collaborate with Nazi Germany.
 14 January – Radio Belgique launches V for Victory campaign.
 21 January – Belgian government in exile reaches an agreement with the United Kingdom that Belgian Congo will become part of the Sterling area and enter the war on the allied side.
 3 March – Dedicated Dutch-language Radio België begins broadcasting from London.
 25 March – Twenty leading figures from the vicinity of Liège taken hostage in retaliation to sabotage of the railway, including former government minister of public works, Jules Joseph Merlot.
 5 May – Flemish collaborationist organisations Vlaams Nationaal Verbond and Verdinaso, and the Flemish section of the Rexist Party, sign an agreement to merge.
 16 May – Anniversary of the German invasion marked by strikes.
 22 June – 337 left-wing activists arrested to prevent.
 25 November – Université Libre de Bruxelles closes to protest plans to appoint pro-German professors.
 6 December – King Leopold marries Lilian Baels in captivity.

Births
 3 February – Antoine Duquesne, politician (died 2010)
 25 February – Nelly Maes, politician
 16 May – Andreas De Leenheer, biologist (died 2022)
 21 March – Dirk Frimout, astronaut
 28 March – Walter van den Broeck, writer
 31 May – Nicole Van Goethem, illustrator (died 2000)
 6 July – Alfons Vansteenwegen, communication theorist
 2 August – Jean Cornelis, footballer (died 2016)
 5 August – August Verhaegen, cyclist (died 2012)
 8 August – Hubert Schoonbroodt, musician (died 1992)
 20 September – Alix de Lannoy, noblewoman (died 2012)
 23 September – Rita Van De Velde, gymnast
 28 September – Lucas Van Looy, bishop
 30 September – Els Witte, historian
 2 October – Jean Vallée, entertainer (died 2014)
 20 October – Leopold Lippens, politician (died 2021)
 24 October – Frank Aendenboom, entertainer (died 2018)
 26 October – Bob de Groot, cartoonist
 17 November – Thierry de Gruben, diplomat
 26 November – Constant Bens, wrestler
 23 December – Serge Reding, weightlifter (died 1975)

Deaths
 18 February – George Minne (born 1866), poet
 9 March – Paul Hymans (born 1865), politician
 28 August – Sybille de Selys Longchamps, noblewoman
 16 September – Valerius De Saedeleer (born 1867), painter
 25 October – Renée de Merode (born 1859), noblewoman

References

 
1940s in Belgium